One Woman: The Ultimate Collection is a compilation album released by American R&B singer Diana Ross by EMI on October 18, 1993. The single-disc collection was the alternative to Ross' 1993 four-CD box set, Forever Diana: Musical Memoirs, which was a 30th anniversary commemorative of her hit-making years over three decades including work with The Supremes. This collection was similar featuring both Supremes hits and solo hits.

It became Ross' best-selling album in the United Kingdom selling over 1,200,000 copies (4× platinum). It peaked at number one on the UK album charts for two weeks, not in sequential order dominating the holiday week of 1993. The success of this release in the United Kingdom meant that Diana would embark on her most extensive tour of Great Britain in her 28 years of touring in that market since her maiden tour with The Supremes on "The Motortown Revue" in 1965.

The album, conceived by advertising agency Mitchell Patterson Aldred Mitchell, was first introduced to the United Kingdom, European and international markets with an inventive four-week sequential advertising buy before its release, on prime time television. The first week began with a shot of her legs laying down and a music sound bed that included the just released new single "Chain Reaction 1993", the second week the viewer would see her mid-torso and teaser quotes inviting the viewer to guess who it was, though the music gave huge cues of her next single "The Best Years of My Life". The third week, the upper torso was now visible, and the final week, days before the album's commercial release, Diana was revealed in a full, sensual photo shoot from Albert Watson lying down, which included a megamix of her biggest hits. This proved to be a hugely successful creative campaign for which EMI International received much praise. 

According to Soundscan, this collection sold over 275,000 in the United States despite never making the charts there. One Woman: The Ultimate Collection also went Platinum in Belgium and Gold in France.

Track listing

International edition 
 "Where Did Our Love Go"  (Holland–Dozier–Holland) – 2:36
 From 1964 album The Supremes: Where Did Our Love Go
 "Baby Love" (Holland–Dozier–Holland) – 2:37
 From Where Did Our Love Go
 "You Can't Hurry Love" (Holland–Dozier–Holland) – 2:54
 From 1966 album The Supremes: The Supremes A' Go-Go
 "Reflections" (Holland–Dozier–Holland) – 2:53
 From 1968 album Diana Ross & The Supremes: Reflections
 "Reach Out and Touch (Somebody's Hand)" (Ashford, Simpson) – 3:01
 From 1970 album Diana Ross
 "Ain't No Mountain High Enough" (7" Edit) (Ashford, Simpson) – 3:30
 Full-length version appears on 1970 album Diana Ross
 "Touch Me in the Morning" (Masser, Miller) – 3:28
 From 1973 album Touch Me in the Morning
 "Love Hangover" (7" Edit) (McLeod, Sawyer) – 3:45
 Full-length version appears on 1976 album Diana Ross
 "I'm Still Waiting" (Richards) – 3:44
 From 1971 album Everything Is Everything
 "Upside Down" (Edwards, Rodgers) – 4:07
 From 1980 album diana
 "Theme from Mahogany (Do You Know Where You're Going To)" (Goffin, Masser) – 3:26
 From 1975 original motion picture soundtrack Mahogany and 1976 album Diana Ross
 "Endless Love" (Duet with Lionel Richie) (Richie) – 4:30
 From 1981 original motion picture soundtrack Endless Love
 "Why Do Fools Fall in Love" (Goldner, Lymon) – 2:55
 From 1981 album Why Do Fools Fall in Love
 "Chain Reaction" (Gibb, Gibb, Gibb) – 3:47
 From 1985 album Eaten Alive
 "When You Tell Me That You Love Me" (Bettis, Hammond) – 4:13
 From 1991 album The Force Behind the Power
 "One Shining Moment" (Thomas) – 4:47
 From The Force Behind the Power
 "If We Hold on Together" (Horner, Mann, Jennings) – 4:11
 From 1988 original motion picture soundtrack The Land Before Time and 1991 album The Force Behind the Power
 "The Best Years of My Life" (Davis, Jennings) – 4:22
 1993 recording
 "Your Love" (Friedman) – 4:04
 1993 recording
 "Let's Make Every Moment Count" (Goffin, Snow) – 4:21
 1993 recording

North American edition 
 "Where Did Our Love Go" (Holland–Dozier–Holland) – 2:36
 From 1964 album The Supremes: Where Did Our Love Go
 "Baby Love" (Holland–Dozier–Holland) – 2:37
 From Where Did Our Love Go
 "Stop! In the Name of Love" (Holland–Dozier–Holland) – 2:53
 From 1965 album The Supremes: More Hits by The Supremes
 "You Can't Hurry Love" (Holland–Dozier–Holland) – 2:54
 From 1966 album The Supremes: The Supremes A' Go-Go
 "Reflections" (Holland–Dozier–Holland) – 2:53
 From 1968 album Diana Ross & The Supremes: Reflections
 "Reach Out and Touch (Somebody's Hand)" (Ashford, Simpson) – 3:01
 From 1970 album Diana Ross
 "Ain't No Mountain High Enough" (7" Edit) (Ashford, Simpson) – 3:30
 Full-length version appears on 1970 album Diana Ross
 "Touch Me in the Morning" (Masser, Miller) – 3:28
 From 1973 album Touch Me in the Morning
 "Theme from Mahogany (Do You Know Where You're Going To)" (Goffin, Masser) – 3:26
 From 1975 original motion picture soundtrack Mahogany and 1976 album Diana Ross
 "Love Hangover" (7" Edit) (McLeod, Sawyer) – 3:45
 Full-length version appears on 1976 album Diana Ross
 "Upside Down" (Edwards, Rodgers) – 4:07
 From 1980 album diana
 "Endless Love" (Duet with Lionel Richie) (Richie) – 4:30
 From 1981 original motion picture soundtrack Endless Love
 "Why Do Fools Fall in Love" (Goldner, Lymon) – 2:55
 From 1981 album Why Do Fools Fall in Love
 "Missing You" (Lionel Richie) – 4:19
 From 1984 album Swept Away
 "Chain Reaction" (Gibb, Gibb, Gibb) – 3:47
 From 1985 album Eaten Alive
 "When You Tell Me That You Love Me" (Bettis, Hammond) – 4:13
 From 1991 album The Force Behind the Power
 "One Shining Moment" (Thomas) – 4:47
 From The Force Behind the Power
 "If We Hold on Together" (Horner, Mann, Jennings) – 4:11
 From 1988 original motion picture soundtrack The Land Before Time and 1991 album The Force Behind the Power
 "The Best Years of My Life" (Davis, Jennings) – 4:22
 1993 recording
 "Someday We'll Be Together" (Single Remix) (Jackey Beavers, Johnny Bristol, Harvey Fuqua) – 4:03
 Original version on 1969 album The Supremes: Cream of the Crop

Charts

Weekly charts

Year-end charts

Certifications

References

1993 greatest hits albums
EMI Records compilation albums
Diana Ross compilation albums